The Bergmann Hotel is a historic hotel located at 434 3rd Street in Juneau, Alaska. It is listed on the National Register of Historic Places.

Marie Bergmann and Early History of the Hotel
The hotel was constructed by Marie E. Bergmann to cater to local miners. According to a biography of the property and Ms. Bergmann maintained by the National Register of Historic Places, Ms. Bergmann  settled in the Juneau area in 1896, after the death of her husband in Seattle.

A pioneer in pre-statehood Alaska, Bergmann was an established name in the Juneau hotel business of the period. Marie Bergmann began her professional life in Juneau by working in the hotel industry as well as nursing. Ms. Bergmann originally envisioned a larger, more opulent hotel—but without additional investors and financing she was forced to scale back her plans. The grand opening of the hotel occurred on December 16, 1913. Marie Bergmann died in 1918 of a reported brain hemorrhage.

The building was listed on the National Register of Historic Places in 1978.

Modern role

Although listed as a hotel, the building served primarily as miners housing, with most occupants renting rooms by the week or month. Rooms in the Bergmann did not contain kitchens, although all contained sinks. Restroom, shower and laundry facilities were shared. There are three toilets and three shower facilities per floor. Laundry and microwave facilities are on each floor.  The hotel has been owned since 2001 by Camilla Barrett and James M. Barrett esq.(until 2017 due to health reasons).

See also
National Register of Historic Places listings in Juneau, Alaska

References

External links

1913 establishments in Alaska
2017 disestablishments in Alaska
Companies based in Juneau, Alaska
Culture of Juneau, Alaska
Defunct hotels in the United States
Drinking establishments in Alaska
Drinking establishments on the National Register of Historic Places in Alaska
Hotel buildings on the National Register of Historic Places in Alaska
Hotels established in 1913
Hotels disestablished in 2017
National Historic Landmarks in Alaska
Buildings and structures on the National Register of Historic Places in Juneau, Alaska
Pre-statehood history of Alaska
Unused buildings in Alaska